Spherical wave transformations leave the form of spherical waves as well as the laws of optics and electrodynamics invariant in all inertial frames. They were defined between 1908 and 1909 by Harry Bateman and Ebenezer Cunningham, with Bateman giving the transformation its name. They correspond to the conformal group of "transformations by reciprocal radii" in relation to the framework of Lie sphere geometry, which were already known in the 19th century. Time is used as fourth dimension as in Minkowski space, so spherical wave transformations are connected to the Lorentz transformation of special relativity, and it turns out that the conformal group of spacetime includes the Lorentz group and the Poincaré group as subgroups. However, only the Lorentz/Poincaré groups represent symmetries of all laws of nature including mechanics, whereas the conformal group is related to certain areas such as electrodynamics. In addition, it can be shown that the conformal group of the plane (corresponding to the Möbius group of the extended complex plane) is isomorphic to the Lorentz group.

A special case of Lie sphere geometry is the transformation by reciprocal directions or Laguerre inversion, being a generator of the Laguerre group. It transforms not only spheres into spheres but also planes into planes. If time is used as fourth dimension, a close analogy to the Lorentz transformation as well as isomorphism to the Lorentz group was pointed out by several authors such as Bateman, Cartan or Poincaré.

Transformation by reciprocal radii

Development in the 19th century 
Inversions preserving angles between circles were first discussed by Durrande (1820), with Quetelet (1827) and Plücker (1828) writing down the corresponding transformation formula,  being the radius of inversion:

.

These inversions were later called "transformations by reciprocal radii", and became better known when Thomson (1845, 1847) applied them on spheres with coordinates  in the course of developing the method of inversion in electrostatics. Joseph Liouville (1847) demonstrated its mathematical meaning by showing that it belongs to the conformal transformations producing the following quadratic form:

.

.

Subsequently, Liouville's theorem was extended to  dimensions by Lie (1871) and others such as Darboux (1878):

.

This group of conformal transformations by reciprocal radii preserves angles and transforms spheres into spheres or hyperspheres (see Möbius transformation, conformal symmetry, special conformal transformation). It is a 6-parameter group in the plane R2 which corresponds to the Möbius group of the extended complex plane, a 10-parameter group in space R3, and a 15-parameter group in R4. In R2 it represents only a small subset of all conformal transformations therein, whereas in R2+n it is identical to the group of all conformal transformations (corresponding to the Möbius transformations in higher dimensions) therein, in accordance with Liouville's theorem. Conformal transformations in R3 were often applied to what Darboux (1873) called "pentaspherical coordinates" by relating the points to homogeneous coordinates based on five spheres.

Oriented spheres 
Another method for solving such sphere problems was to write down the coordinates together with the sphere's radius. This was employed by Lie (1871) in the context of Lie sphere geometry which represents a general framework of sphere-transformations (being a special case of contact transformations) conserving lines of curvature and transforming spheres into spheres. The previously mentioned 10-parameter group in R3 related to pentaspherical coordinates is extended to the 15-parameter group of Lie sphere transformations related to "hexaspherical coordinates" (named by Klein in 1893) by adding a sixth homogeneous coordinate related to the radius. Since the radius of a sphere can have a positive or negative sign, one sphere always corresponds to two transformed spheres. It is advantageous to remove this ambiguity by attributing a definite sign to the radius, consequently giving the spheres a definite orientation too, so that one oriented sphere corresponds to one transformed oriented sphere. This method was occasionally and implicitly employed by Lie (1871) himself and explicitly introduced by Laguerre (1880). In addition, Darboux (1887) brought the transformations by reciprocal radii into a form by which the radius r of a sphere can be determined if the radius of the other one is known:

Using coordinates together with the radius was often connected to a method called "minimal projection" by Klein (1893), which was later called "isotropy projection" by Blaschke (1926) emphasizing the relation to oriented circles and spheres. For instance, a circle with rectangular coordinates  and radius  in R2 corresponds to a point in R3 with coordinates . This method was known for some time in circle geometry (though without using the concept of orientation) and can be further differentiated depending on whether the additional coordinate is treated as imaginary or real:   was used by Chasles (1852), Möbius (1857), Cayley (1867), and Darboux (1872);  was used by Cousinery (1826), Druckenmüller (1842), and in the "cyclography" of Fiedler (1882), therefore the latter method was also called "cyclographic projection" – see E. Müller (1910) for a summary. This method was also applied to spheres by Darboux (1872), Lie (1871), or Klein (1893). Let  and  be the center coordinates and radii of two spheres in three-dimensional space R3. If the spheres are touching each other with same orientation, their equation is given

.

Setting , these coordinates correspond to rectangular coordinates in four-dimensional space R4:

.

In general, Lie (1871) showed that the conformal point transformations in Rn (composed of motions, similarities, and transformations by reciprocal radii) correspond in Rn-1 to those sphere transformations which are contact transformations. Klein (1893) pointed out that by using minimal projection on hexaspherical coordinates, the 15-parameter Lie sphere transformations in R3 are simply the projections of the 15-parameter conformal point transformations in R4, whereas the points in R4 can be seen as the stereographic projection of the points of a sphere in R5.

Relation to electrodynamics
Harry Bateman and Ebenezer Cunningham (1909) showed that the electromagnetic equations are not only Lorentz invariant, but also scale and conformal invariant. They are invariant under the 15-parameter group of conformal transformations  (transformations by reciprocal radii) in R4 producing the relation

,

He wrote:

Depending on  they can be differentiated into subgroups:

(a)  correspond to mappings which transform not only spheres into spheres but also planes into planes. These are called Laguerre transformations/inversions forming the Laguerre group, which in physics correspond to the Lorentz transformations forming the 6-parameter Lorentz group or 10-parameter Poincaré group with translations.

For instance, if  is used, then the transformation given by Poincaré in 1905 follows:

.

However, it was shown by Poincaré and Einstein that only  produces a group that is a symmetry of all laws of nature as required by the principle of relativity (the Lorentz group), while the group of scale transformations is only a symmetry of optics and electrodynamics.

(c) Setting  particularly relates to the wide conformal group of transformations by reciprocal radii. It consists of elementary transformations that represent a generalized inversion into a four-dimensional hypersphere:

Felix Klein (1921) pointed out the similarity of these relations to Lie's and his own researches of 1871, adding that the conformal group doesn't have the same meaning as the Lorentz group, because the former applies to electrodynamics whereas the latter is a symmetry of all laws of nature including mechanics. The possibility was discussed for some time, whether conformal transformations allow for the transformation into uniformly accelerated frames. Later, conformal invariance became important again in certain areas such as conformal field theory.

Lorentz group isomorphic to Möbius group

It turns out that also the 6-parameter conformal group of R2 (i.e. the Möbius group composed of automorphisms of the Riemann sphere), which in turn is isomorphic to the 6-parameter group of hyperbolic motions (i.e. isometric automorphisms of a hyperbolic space) in R3, can be physically interpreted: It is isomorphic to the Lorentz group.

For instance, Fricke and Klein (1897) started by defining an "absolute" Cayley metric in terms of a one-part curvilinear surface of second degree, which can be represented by a sphere whose interior represents hyperbolic space with the equation

,

where  are homogeneous coordinates. They pointed out that motions of hyperbolic space into itself also transform this sphere into itself. They developed the corresponding transformation by defining a complex parameter  of the sphere

which is connected to another parameter  by the substitution

where  are complex coefficients. They furthermore showed that by setting , the above relations assume the form in terms of the unit sphere in R3:

.

which is identical to the stereographic projection of the -plane on a spherical surface already given by Klein in 1884. Since the substitutions  are Möbius transformations in the -plane or upon the -sphere, they concluded that by carrying out an arbitrary motion of hyperbolic space in itself, the -sphere undergoes a Möbius transformation, that the entire group of hyperbolic motions gives all direct Möbius transformations, and finally that any direct Möbius transformation corresponds to a motion of hyperbolic space.

Based on the work of Fricke & Klein, the isomorphism of that group of hyperbolic motions (and consequently of the Möbius group) to the Lorentz group  was demonstrated by Gustav Herglotz (1909). Namely, the Minkowski metric corresponds to the above Cayley metric (based on a real conic section), if the spacetime coordinates are identified with the above homogeneous coordinates

,

by which the above parameter become

 again connected by the substitution .

Herglotz concluded, that any such substitution corresponds to a Lorentz transformation, establishing a one-to-one correspondence to hyperbolic motions in R3. The relation between the Lorentz group and the Cayley metric in hyperbolic space was also pointed out by Klein (1910) as well as Pauli (1921). The corresponding isomorphism of the Möbius group to the Lorentz group was employed, among others, by Roger Penrose.

Transformation by reciprocal directions

Development in the 19th century 
Above, the connection of conformal transformations with coordinates including the radius of spheres within Lie sphere geometry was mentioned. The special case  corresponds to a sphere transformation given by Edmond Laguerre (1880-1885), who called it the "transformation by reciprocal directions" and who laid down the foundation of a geometry of oriented spheres and planes. According to Darboux and Bateman, similar relations were discussed before by Albert Ribaucour (1870) and by Lie himself (1871).  Stephanos (1881) pointed out that Laguerre's geometry is indeed a special case of Lie's sphere geometry. He also represented Laguerre's oriented spheres by quaternions (1883).

Lines, circles, planes, or spheres with radii of certain orientation are called by Laguerre half-lines, half-circles (cycles), half-planes, half-spheres, etc. A tangent is a half-line cutting a cycle at a point where both have the same direction. The transformation by reciprocal directions transforms oriented spheres into oriented spheres and oriented planes into oriented planes, leaving invariant the "tangential distance" of two cycles (the distance between the points of each one of their common tangents), and also conserves the lines of curvature. Laguerre (1882) applied the transformation to two cycles under the following conditions: Their radical axis is the axis of transformation, and their common tangents are parallel to two fixed directions of the half-lines that are transformed into themselves (Laguerre called this specific method the "transformation by reciprocal half-lines", which was later called "Laguerre inversion").

with the transformation:

with

  
consequently he obtained the relation

.

As mentioned above, oriented spheres in R3 can be represented by points of four-dimensional space R4 using minimal (isotropy) projection, which became particularly important in Laguerre's geometry. For instance, E. Müller (1898) based his discussion of oriented spheres on the fact that they can be mapped upon the points of a plane manifold of four dimensions (which he likened to Fiedler's "cyclography" from 1882). He systematically compared the transformations by reciprocal radii (calling it "inversion at a sphere") with the transformations by reciprocal directions (calling it "inversion at a plane sphere complex"). Following Müller's paper, Smith (1900) discussed Laguerre's transformation and the related "group of the geometry of reciprocal directions". Alluding to Klein's (1893) treatment of minimal projection, he pointed out that this group "is simply isomorphic with the group of all displacements and symmetry transformations in space of four dimensions". Smith obtained the same transformation as Laguerre and Darboux in different notation, calling it "inversion into a spherical complex":

with the relations

Laguerre inversion and Lorentz transformation 

In 1905 both Poincaré and Einstein pointed out that the Lorentz transformation of special relativity (setting )

leaves the relation  invariant. Einstein stressed the point that by this transformation a spherical light wave in one frame is transformed into a spherical light wave in another one. Poincaré showed that the Lorentz transformation can be seen as a rotation in four-dimensional space with time as fourth coordinate, with Minkowski deepening this insight much further (see History of special relativity).

As shown above, also Laguerre's transformation by reciprocal directions or half-lines – later called Laguerre inversion – in the form given by Darboux (1887) leaves the expression  invariant. Subsequently, the relation to the Lorentz transformation was noted by several authors. For instance, Bateman (1910) argued that this transformation (which he attributed to Ribaucour) is "identical" to the Lorentz transformation. Bateman (1910) also sketched geometric representations of relativistic light spheres using such spherical systems. However, Kubota (1925) responded to Bateman by arguing that the Laguerre inversion is involutory whereas the Lorentz transformation is not. He concluded that in order to make them equivalent, the Laguerre inversion has to be combined with a reversal of direction of the cycles.

The specific relation between the Lorentz transformation and the Laguerre inversion can also be demonstrated as follows (see H.R. Müller (1948) for analogous formulas in different notation). Laguerre's inversion formulas from 1882 (equivalent to those of Darboux in 1887) read:

 
by setting

it follows

finally by setting  the Laguerre inversion becomes very similar to the Lorentz transformation except that the expression  is reversed into :

.

According to Müller, the Lorentz transformation can be seen as the product of an even number of such Laguerre inversions that change the sign. See section #Laguerre group isomorphic to Lorentz group for more details of the connection between the Laguerre inversion to other variants of Laguerre transformations.

Lorentz transformation within Laguerre geometry 

Timerding (1911) used Laguerre's concept of oriented spheres in order to represent and derive the Lorentz transformation.

resulting in the transformation

Following Timerding and Bateman, Ogura (1913) analyzed a Laguerre transformation of the form

,

which become the Lorentz transformation with

    .

He stated that "the Laguerre transformation in sphere manifoldness is equivalent to the Lorentz transformation in spacetime manifoldness".

Laguerre group isomorphic to Lorentz group 
As shown above, the group of conformal point transformations in Rn (composed of motions, similarities, and inversions) can be related by minimal projection to the group of contact transformations in Rn-1 transforming circles or spheres into other circles or spheres. In addition, Lie (1871, 1896) pointed out that in R3 there is a 7-parameter subgroup of point transformations composed of motions and similarities, which by using minimal projection corresponds to a 7-parameter subgroup of contact transformations in R2 transforming circles into circles. These relations were further studied by Smith (1900), Blaschke (1910), Coolidge (1916) and others, who pointed out the connection to Laguerre's geometry of reciprocal directions related to oriented lines, circles, planes and spheres. Therefore, Smith (1900) called it the "group of the geometry of reciprocal directions", and Blaschke (1910) used the expression "Laguerre group". The "extended Laguerre group" consists of motions and similarities, having 7 parameters in R2 transforming oriented lines and circles, or 11 parameters in R3 transforming oriented planes and spheres. If similarities are excluded, it becomes the "restricted Laguerre group" having 6 parameters in R2 and 10 parameters in R3, consisting of orientation-preserving or orientation-reversing motions, and preserving the tangential distance between oriented circles or spheres. Subsequently, it became common that the term Laguerre group only refers to the restricted Laguerre group. It was also noted that the Laguerre group is part of a wider group conserving tangential distances, called the "equilong group" by Scheffers (1905).

In R2 the Laguerre group leaves invariant the relation , which can be extended to arbitrary Rn as well. For instance, in R3 it leaves invariant the relation . This is equivalent to relation  in R4 by using minimal (isotropy) projection with imaginary radius coordinate, or cyclographic projection (in descriptive geometry) with real radius coordinate. The transformations forming the Laguerre group can be further differentiated into "direct Laguerre transformations" which are related to motions preserving both the tangential distance as well as the sign; or "indirect Laguerre transformations" which are related to orientation-reversing motions, preserving the tangential distance with the sign reversed. The Laguerre inversion first given by Laguerre in 1882 is involutory, thus it belongs to the indirect Laguerre transformations. Laguerre himself did not discuss the group related to his inversion, but it turned out that every Laguerre transformation can be generated by at most four Laguerre inversions and every direct Laguerre transformation is the product of two involutory transformations, thus Laguerre inversions are of special importance because they are generating operators of the entire Laguerre group.

It was noted that the Laguerre group is indeed isomorphic to the Lorentz group (or the Poincaré group if translations are included), as both groups leave invariant the form . After the first comparison of the Lorentz transformation and the Laguerre inversion by Bateman (1910) as mentioned above, the equivalence of both groups was pointed out by Cartan in 1912 and 1914, and he expanded upon it in 1915 (published 1955) in the French version of Klein's encyclopedia. Also Poincaré (1912, published 1921) wrote:

Others who noticed this connection include Coolidge (1916), Klein & Blaschke (1926), Blaschke (1929), H.R. Müller, Kunle & Fladt (1970), Benz (1992). It was recently pointed out:

See also 
 History of Lorentz transformations

Primary sources 
 

Felix Klein (1884), Vorlesungen über das Ikosaeder und die Auflösung der Gleichungen vom fünften Grade, Teubner, Leipzig; English translation: Lectures on the ikosahedron and the solution of equations of the fifth degree (1888)
 Reprinted in  English translation by David Delphenich: On the geometric foundations of the Lorentz group
.

 English translation by David Delphenich: On complexes - in particular, line and sphere complexes - with applications to the theory of partial differential equations

. Written by Poincaré in 1912, printed in Acta Mathematica in 1914 though belatedly published in 1921.

Secondary sources 
Textbooks, encyclopaedic entries, historical surveys:

 (Only pages 1–21 were published in 1915, the entire article including pp. 39–43 concerning the groups of Laguerre and Lorentz was posthumously published in 1955 in Cartan's collected papers, and was reprinted in the Encyclopédie in 1991.)

 Robert Fricke & Felix Klein (1897), Vorlesungen über die Theorie der autormorphen Functionen - Erster Band: Die gruppentheoretischen Grundlagen, Teubner, Leipzig

 (Klein's lectures from 1893 updated and edited by Blaschke in 1926.)

Spheres
History of physics
Special relativity
Equations
Electromagnetism